Lü Zhong (born 17 December 1940) is a Chinese actress.

Selected filmography

Film

Television series

Theatre

References

External links

1940 births
Living people
Chinese film actresses
Chinese television actresses
20th-century Chinese actresses
21st-century Chinese actresses
People from Baoji
Actresses from Shaanxi
Asia Pacific Screen Award winners